Jane Hansen  is an Australian investment banker, business executive and philanthropist. She was appointed the 23rd Chancellor of the University of Melbourne on 1 January 2023. She was initially appointed to the University of Melbourne Council on 1 January 2016 and has been deputy chancellor of the University of Melbourne since 2017.

Education 
Hansen graduated from Monash University with a Bachelor of Economics and then studied for a Master of Finance and Business Administration at Columbia University in New York. She then worked in corporate finance. Later in her career, she completed a Bachelor of Arts (History) at the University of Melbourne.

Career 
After completing her Master of Finance and Business Administration, Hansen worked for more than 20 years as a corporate finance expert with Macquarie Bank and First Boston/Credit Suisse. 

In 2014, Hansen joined the board of the Melbourne Theatre Company. The following year she established the Melbourne Theatre Company Foundation, as its first chair. In 2016, she and her husband, Paul Little, donated AU$1million to the Foundation. In December 2019, she became chair of the Melbourne Theatre Company.

She is currently CEO and Chair of the Hansen Little Foundation,  Chair of the Melbourne Theatre Company, Chair of the University of Melbourne Campaign Advisory Board, member of the advisory board for the Melbourne Humanities Foundation and board member of Opera Australia  and The Lord Mayor's Charitable Foundation, the largest public foundation in Australia. She is also a Member of Chief Executive Women and the Australian Institute of Company Directors.

In a unique philanthropic partnership with the University of Melbourne, Hansen and Paul Little established the Hansen Scholarship. A flagship scholarship worth $108,000, “The Hansen Scholarship Program will significantly expand the horizons of its recipients – enabling and emboldening them to reframe their dreams and reimagine their futures.”   The annual scholarship––which will run for an initial 40 years––welcomed its inaugural cohort in 2020.

Honours & awards 
In the 2020 Australia Day Honours, Hansen was made an Officer of the Order of Australia for "distinguished service to the community, to education and cultural institutions, and through philanthropic support for charitable foundations".

In 2020, Hansen made a donation to the History Council of Victoria who, in recognition, has inaugurated the Jane Hansen Prize for History Advocacy awarded annually since 2021.

References

External links 
 

Living people
Year of birth missing (living people)
Monash University alumni
Columbia Business School alumni
Officers of the Order of Australia
Australian philanthropists
Philanthropists from Melbourne
Australian bankers
Chancellors of the University of Melbourne